Francis William Galpin (December 25, 1858  December 30, 1945) was an English cleric and antiquarian musicologist. He was known as a collector of old musical instruments.

Life
Born in Dorchester, Dorset, Galpin was educated at Sherborne and Trinity College, Cambridge, where he studied organ under Sterndale Bennett. He was ordained in the Church of England in 1883, became as a recent graduate of that year curate at Redenhall with Harleston in Norfolk; and went on to be a curate at St Giles in the Fields, London.

As vicar of Hatfield Regis in Essex during the 1890s, Galpin organised concerts with instruments from his collection, including recorders, lutes and serpents. Subsequently, he was vicar at Witham, and then Faulkbourne. Galpin also served as President of the Essex Archaeological Society.

His students included Geneviève Thibault de Chambure.

In 1946 the Galpin Society was formed to further his work on musical instruments.

Collection
In 1916, Galpin sold his collection of over 500 antique musical instruments to William Lindsey, who donated them to the Museum of Fine Arts, Boston in memory of his daughter Leslie Lindsey Mason.

Works
Galpin wrote:

Descriptive Catalogue of the European Instruments in the Modern Museum of Art (1902)
The Musical Instruments of the American Indians (1903)
Notes on the Roman Hydraulus (1904)
The Sackbut (1907)
Old English Instruments of Music (1910)
A Textbook of European Musical Instruments (1937)
The Music of the Sumerians, Babylonians and Assyrians (1937)

References

1858 births
1945 deaths
English antiquarians
English musicologists
People educated at Sherborne School
People from Dorchester, Dorset
19th-century English Anglican priests
20th-century English Anglican priests